Hilarographini is a tribe of moths in the family Tortricidae.

Genera 
Charitographa
Hilarographa (syn: Thaumatographa)
Idiothauma
Tortrimosaica

Former genera
Mictocommosis
Nexosa

Taxonomy
The monobasic Embolostoma does not belong in this tribe. Another genus usually included is Irianassa, but this genus belongs in Enarmoniini. One of its species however (Irianassa poecilaspis) does belong to Hilarographini. The genera Nexosa and Mictocommosis belong to the Archipini.

References